|}

The Foundation Stakes is a Listed flat horse race in Great Britain open to horses aged three years or older. It is run at Goodwood over a distance of 1 mile, 1 furlong and 197 yards (1,991 metres), and it is scheduled to take place each year in September. In 2011 it was run under the sponsored title of the Tanqueray Stakes.

Winners since 1988

See also
 Horse racing in Great Britain
 List of British flat horse races

References
 Paris-Turf: 
, 
 Racing Post:

Flat races in Great Britain
Goodwood Racecourse
Open middle distance horse races